Jared Genser (born June 17, 1972) is an international human rights lawyer who serves as managing director of the law firm Perseus Strategies, LLC, as well as the special advisor on the Responsibility to Protect to the Organization of American States. He is also a co-Executive Producer on a new Amazon Studios television series based on his life being developed with Orlando Bloom. Genser is a senior fellow at the Raoul Wallenberg Centre for Human Rights and previously was an associate of the Carr Center for Human Rights Policy at Harvard University from 2014 to 2016 and a visiting fellow with the National Endowment for Democracy from 2006 to 2007. Earlier in his career, he founded the non-profit Freedom Now and was named by the National Law Journal as one of "40 Under 40: Washington's Rising Stars."

He has served as international counsel to a number of prominent human rights activists and political prisoners, including Václav Havel, Aung San Suu Kyi, Desmond Tutu, Elie Wiesel, former Malaysian Deputy Prime Minister Anwar Ibrahim, Venezuelan politician Leopoldo López, former Maldives President Mohamed Nasheed, and Liu Xiaobo and his wife Liu Xia. In 2013, he received the American Bar Association's International Human Rights Award and in 2020 he was awarded the Tällberg Foundation's Tällberg/Eliasson Global Leadership Prize.

Early life and education 

Genser was born in New Haven, Connecticut, and grew up in suburban Maryland.  Genser received a B.S. from Cornell University in 1995.  He subsequently earned a Master in Public Policy degree from the John F. Kennedy School of Government at Harvard University, where he was an Alumni Public Service Fellow and a J.D. cum laude from the University of Michigan Law School.  He was also a Raoul Wallenberg Scholar at Hebrew University of Jerusalem.

Career 

Genser began his career as a management consultant with McKinsey & Company.  He later joined DLA Piper, where he was elected a partner. In 2011, he left DLA Piper to found Perseus Strategies, a human-rights law firm. Genser is an adjunct professor of law at Georgetown University Law Center, and has taught in the past at the University of Michigan Law School and University of Pennsylvania Law School. In June 2014 it was announced he would partner with the PR firm Levick in regard to "the international and local media narrative" surrounding the Nigerian government's efforts on the Chibok schoolgirls kidnapping. In October 2020, Genser was appointed by OAS Secretary General Luis Almagro as the special adviser on the Responsibility to Protect for the Organization of American States.

Books and publications 
Genser is the author of The UN Working Group on Arbitrary Detention: Commentary and Guide to Practice.  He was also a co-editor with Canadian Member of Parliament Irwin Cotler for The Responsibility to Protect: The Promise of Stopping Mass Atrocities in Our Time and with former Minister of Foreign Affairs of Costa Rica Bruno Stagno Ugarte for The UN Security Council in the Age of Human Rights.

Genser has published more than 180 op-eds on human-rights topics in major newspapers around the world including The Baltimore Sun, The Boston Globe, The Chosun Ilbo (Seoul), Far Eastern Economic Review, The Huffington Post, The Independent (UK), International Herald Tribune, The Jakarta Post, Los Angeles Times, South China Morning Post, The Sydney Morning Herald, The Nation (Thailand), The Star (South Africa), The Times (UK), The Wall Street Journal, The New York Times, and The Washington Post.

Other activities and awards 

Genser is a life member of the Council on Foreign Relations and a Fellow of the Royal Society of Arts.  He was elected in 2008 as a Fellow to the British American Project.  In 2009 he was elected as a delegate to the Asia Society's Asia 21 Young Leaders Summit and also as a U.S.-Japan Young Leadership Fellow.  Genser was a Young Global Leader of the World Economic Forum from 2008 to 2013 and a Member of the World Economic Forum's Global Agenda Council for Human Rights (2010–2011).  In 2011, he was selected among the Young Leaders of the French-American Foundation. He is a recipient of the Charles Bronfman Prize and Liberty in North Korea's Freedom Fighter Award.  In addition to being qualified to practice law in Maryland and the District of Columbia, he is also a solicitor of England & Wales.

References 

Living people
Cornell University alumni
Harvard Kennedy School alumni
University of Michigan Law School alumni
Lawyers from New Haven, Connecticut
Human rights lawyers
Young Leaders of the French-American Foundation
1972 births